5α-Dihydronorethandrolone (5α-DHNED), also known as 17α-ethyl-4,5α-dihydro-19-nortestosterone or as 17α-ethyl-5α-estran-17β-ol-3-one, is an androgen/anabolic steroid and a metabolite of norethandrolone (as well as of the prodrug ethylestrenol) formed by 5α-reductase. Analogously to nandrolone and its 5α-reduced metabolite 5α-dihydronandrolone, 5α-DHNED shows reduced affinity for the androgen receptor relative to norethandrolone. Its affinity for the androgen receptor is specifically about 64% of that of norethandrolone.

See also
 5α-Dihydronormethandrone
 5α-Dihydronorethisterone
 5α-Dihydrolevonorgestrel
 Ethylestradiol

References

5α-Reduced steroid metabolites
1-Ethylcyclopentanols
Androgens and anabolic steroids
Human drug metabolites
Estranes
Ketones
Progestogens